Satoru Furuta (古田悟, born 3 August 1971) is a Japanese former basketball player.

Head coaching record

|- 
| style="text-align:left;"|Haneda Vickies
| style="text-align:left;"|2015-16
| 25||5||20|||| style="text-align:center;"|9th|||-||-||-||
| style="text-align:center;"|
|- 
| style="text-align:left;"|Haneda Vickies
| style="text-align:left;"|2016-17
| 27||10||17|||| style="text-align:center;"|8th|||2||0||2||
| style="text-align:center;"|Lost in 1st round
|-

| style="text-align:left;"|Yokohama B-Corsairs
| style="text-align:left;"|2017
| 19||4||15|||| style="text-align:center;"|Fired|||-||-||-||
| style="text-align:center;"|
|-
| style="text-align:left;"|Earth Friends Tokyo Z
| style="text-align:left;"|2018-19
| 60||22||38|||| style="text-align:center;"|4th in B2 Central|||-||-||-||
| style="text-align:center;"|
|-

References

1971 births
Living people
Japanese men's basketball players
Alvark Tokyo players
Asian Games medalists in basketball
People from Seto, Aichi
Basketball players at the 1994 Asian Games
Basketball players at the 2002 Asian Games
Earth Friends Tokyo Z coaches
Japanese basketball coaches
Japanese women's basketball coaches
Asian Games bronze medalists for Japan
Nagoya Diamond Dolphins players
Yokohama B-Corsairs coaches
2006 FIBA World Championship players
1998 FIBA World Championship players
Medalists at the 1994 Asian Games
Universiade medalists in basketball
Universiade silver medalists for Japan
Medalists at the 1995 Summer Universiade
20th-century Japanese people
21st-century Japanese people